
Year 415 BC was a year of the pre-Julian Roman calendar. At the time, it was known as the Year of the Tribunate of Cossus, Vibulanus, Volusus and Cincinnatus (or, less frequently, year 339 Ab urbe condita). The denomination 415 BC for this year has been used since the early medieval period, when the Anno Domini calendar era became the prevalent method in Europe for naming years.

Events 
 By place 
 Greece 
 Athenian orator and politician, Andocides is imprisoned on suspicion of having taken part in the mutilation of the sacred busts called "Hermae" shortly before the departure of Athens' military expedition to Sicily. These mutilations cause a general panic, and Andocides is induced to turn informer. Andocides' testimony is accepted, and those whom he implicates, including Alcibiades, are condemned to death. Andocides is sent into exile.
 The Athenian expedition to Sicily sets sail under Nicias, Lamachus and Alcibiades. After his departure with the armada, Alcibiades is accused of profanity and is recalled to Athens to stand trial.
 After learning that he has been condemned to death in absentia, Alcibiades defects to Sparta and Nicias is placed in charge of the Sicilian expedition. The Athenian forces land at Dascon near Syracuse but with little result. Hermocrates heads the Syracusan defence.
 Alcibiades openly joins with the Spartans and persuades them to send Gylippus to assist Syracuse and to fortify Decelea in Attica. He also encourages Ionia to revolt against Athens. As a result, a Spartan fleet soon arrives to reinforce their allies in Syracuse and a stalemate ensues.
 Construction of the Temple of Hephaestus in Athens is completed. Construction had begun in 449 BC.

 By topic 
 Drama 
 Euripides' play The Trojan Women is performed shortly after the massacre by Athenians of the male population of Melos.

References